Dimple Chopade is an Indian actress. She acts in Telugu, Kannada, and Tamil films.

Early life
She was born in Pune, India and graduated in Symbiosis International University, Pune. She has learnt horse riding and the Mallakhamb.

Career
She tried her hand at Marathi theatre after doing a short course in film making from the Pune Film Institute. She was offered a role in a Kannada film when she was 18. Although that film, Sihimuthu, has not released yet, she went on to do four more Kannada films. Her first release was Kote in 2011.

She made her foray in Tamil, with a film called Yaaruda Mahesh, which had Sundeep Kishan in the lead. She had worked with Mohan in the Kannada film Nanthara.

Filmography

References

External links
 

Indian film actresses
Actresses in Tamil cinema
Actresses in Kannada cinema
Actresses in Telugu cinema
Living people
Actresses from Pune
21st-century Indian actresses
1985 births